Mesocolpia protrusata is a moth in the family Geometridae. It is found in Kenya and Uganda.

References

External links

Moths described in 1902
Eupitheciini
Moths of Africa